The 2022 Richmond Spiders football team represented the University of Richmond as a member of the Colonial Athletic Association (CAA) in the 2022 NCAA Division I FCS football season. The Spiders, led by sixth-year head coach Russ Huesman, played their home games at E. Claiborne Robins Stadium.

Previous season

After beginning the season as a fringe Top 25 team and winning their first two games, the Spiders lost five games in a row before recovering to finish the season on a four-game winning streak. At 6–5 with a 4–4 record in CAA play, the Spiders did not qualify for the FCS playoffs.

Preseason
Following the graduation of four-year starting quarterback Joe Mancuso, the Spiders brought in graduate transfer Reece Udinski from Maryland to lead the team in 2022. Udinski, who formerly played at VMI, reunites with his former teammate Jakob Herres at wide receiver.

CAA poll
In the CAA preseason poll released on July 28, 2022, the Spiders were predicted to finish in fourth place out of 13 teams following the departure of James Madison and the addition of Monmouth and Hampton for the 2022 season.

Preseason All-CAA team
Junior linebacker Tristan Wheeler and senior kick returner Aaron Dykes were named to the CAA preseason all-conference team.

Schedule

Game summaries

at Virginia

Saint Francis

at Lehigh

Stony Brook

at No. 23 Elon

No. 17 Villanova

at Hampton

at Maine

No. 17 New Hampshire

at No. 17 Delaware

No. 8 William & Mary

FCS Playoffs

Davidson - First Round

at No. 2 Sacramento State - Second Round

Ranking movements

References

Richmond
Richmond Spiders football seasons
Richmond
Richmond Spiders football